Young Sohn is a Korean-American business executive and investor. He is the president and chief strategy officer of Samsung Electronics. Sohn is also the chairman of the board of Harman International Industries, a subsidiary of Samsung Electronics.

During his career, Sohn has acted as either chief executive officer or as a board member to PLX Technology, Synnex and Inphi Corporation, and has been recognized as "the best-connected chip executive in the semiconductor industry."

Early life and education 
Sohn graduated from the University of Pennsylvania with a BS in electrical engineering and received an MS from the MIT Sloan School of Management.

Career

Early career 
Sohn joined Intel as a product marketing manager and later became its director of new business development. As director of new business development, Sohn oversaw the creation of Intel's PC chipset business. He also formed the company's inaugural joint venture with Samsung Electronics. Sohn was Vice President of Marketing, and later, Co-President of Quantum Corporation. He was also appointed president of the company's Storage Group. Sohn was a chairman and chief executive officer at Oak Technology, a digital media semiconductor company. During his time with the company, he oversaw the acquisition by Zoran Corporation.

Sohn was the president of Agilent Technologies' semiconductor group, the launch of its spin-off entity, Avago as a senior advisor of Silver Lake. Sohn helped form Panorama Capital, a venture capital firm which spun off from JP Morgan Partners. He was also a senior advisor to One Laptop per Child with MIT Media Lab. He was the president and chief executive officer of Inphi Corporation. Sohn led the company's initial public offering.

Samsung 
In 2012, Sohn was appointed corporate president and Chief strategy officer of Samsung Electronics. Sohn's promotion marked the company's first president-level appointment of an executive outside of Korea. By 2013, Samsung Electronics had announced that Sohn would also head the Samsung Strategy and Innovation Center. He secured the $8 billion acquisition of Harman International Industries, which marked Samsung's entry into the autonomous vehicle industry.  Following the acquisition, Sohn became chairman of the board of directors of Harman.

Sohn has represented Samsung at technology conferences and gatherings. In 2015, he organized Samsung's first CEO Summit. Sohn delivered a keynote address on AI at Web Summit and has spoken at SLUSH, the Tech for Good Summit with French President Emmanuel Macron, and additional international gatherings of members of the technology industry.

In 2014, Sohn, along with Bill Tai from Charles River Ventures, founded the Extreme Tech Challenge, or XTC, a nonprofit startup competition that aims to address United Nations' 17 Sustainable Development Goals.

In 2017, Sohn launched the $300 million Samsung Automotive Innovation Fund, to focus on connected car investments.

In 2019, Sohn was honored with a Trail Blazer award at the Asia America Multitechnology Association 40th anniversary dinner and with a Corporate Leader Award by the Korean American Community Foundation of San Francisco.

In July 2020, Sohn led a $14 million series B investment into genomics startup Genome Medical, via Samsung’s venture fund, called Samsung Catalyst Fund.

Board memberships 
Sohn sits on the MIT Sloan School North America Board, and is a member of the board of directors at Cadence Design Systems. He has been a senior advisor for Silver Lake Partners since 2012. Sohn is also an advisor to Bitfury, Zoom Video Communications and the University of California Innovation Council.

He has also sat on the boards of ARM, Synnex Corporation, Cymer, Inc. Hyundai Electronics (now SK Hynix) and PLX Technology. Sohn is chairman of the Global Corporate Venturing leadership society, a membership organization for corporate venture capitalists.

References 

Year of birth missing (living people)
Living people
University of Pennsylvania alumni
MIT Sloan School of Management alumni
Samsung people
American people of Korean descent
American businesspeople
Technology business executives